Tegula bergeroni is a species of sea snail, a marine gastropod mollusk in the family Tegulidae.

Description
The height of the shell attains 13.4 mm, its diameter 14.4 mm.

Distribution
This marine species occurs in the Pacific Ocean off Colombia.

References

  McLean J. (1970 ["1969"]). New species of tropical eastern Pacific Gastropoda. Malacological Review, 2(2): 115-130

External links
 To USNM Invertebrate Zoology Mollusca Collection
 To World Register of Marine Species

 bergeroni
Gastropods described in 1970